A Spartan is a person from the ancient Greek city-state of Sparta.

The word may also refer to the following:

People
 Roderick Bradley, who competes as "Spartan", a gladiator in the UK TV series Gladiators
 Andrey Koreshkov (born 1990), Russian mixed martial artist nicknamed "Spartan"
 Vinicius Queiroz (born 1983), Brazilian mixed martial artist nicknamed "Spartan"

Entertainment

Fictional characters
 SPARTAN Program, supersoldiers in the Halo series of games
 Spartan (comics), a Wildstorm comic book character
 John Diggle, a character in the TV series Arrow codenamed "Spartan"

Other uses in entertainment
 Spartan (book), a 1988 novel by Valerio Massimo Manfredi
 Spartan (film), 2004 American film written and directed by David Mamet
 Spartan (video game), a 2004 computer game
 Spartan: Total Warrior, a 2005 console-based video game
 Spartan: Ultimate Team Challenge, sports entertainment TV show based on the Spartan race obstacle challenge
 "Spartan" (Arrow episode), 2019

Sports
 Spartan race, a type of obstacle-based race
 Spartans, runners who have completed 10 Melbourne Marathons

Transport and military

Aviation
 Alenia C-27J Spartan, military tactical transport aircraft
Spartan Aircraft Company, American firm
Spartan 8W Zeus
Spartan 12W Executive
Spartan C2
Spartan C3
Spartan C4
Spartan C5
Spartan NP
Spartan Executive
Spartan Aircraft Ltd, British firm
Simmonds Spartan
Spartan Arrow
Spartan Three Seater
Spartan Cruiser
Spartan Clipper
Spartan Microlights, an American aircraft manufacturer
Spartan DFD Aerotome, an American ultralight aircraft
Spartan DFS Paramotor, an American ultralight aircraft
Spartan DFS Trike, an American ultralight aircraft
Spartan BP Parawing, an American ultralight aircraft
 Simmonds Spartan, 1920s British biplane

Land vehicles
 Spartan Motors, manufacturer of fire fighting vehicles
 FV103 Spartan, British armoured personnel carrier
 Streit Group Spartan APC, light armoured vehicle, built in Canada and Ukraine
 Spartan Cars, a British kit car maker

Ships
 , various British Royal Navy ships
 , a United States Navy minesweeper in commission from 1917 to 1919
 , a railroad car ferry on Lake Michigan formerly operated by the Chesapeake and Ohio Railway (C&O)

Ballistics
 LIM-49 Spartan, American anti-ballistic missile

Other meanings
 Spartan (chemistry software), a molecular modeling and computational chemistry application
 Spartan (apple), an apple cultivar developed in 1926
 Spartan (typeface), a geometric sans-serif typeface
 Spartan or Project Spartan, the code name of the Microsoft Edge web browser
 Spartan Alphabet, in fingerspelling
 The Spartans Drum and Bugle Corps, an Open Class drum and bugle corps from Nashua, New Hampshire
 Spartan Communications, a company based in Spartanburg, South Carolina, that was purchased by Medi
 Xilinx Spartan, a family of integrated circuits
 Station power, articulation, thermal, and analysis (SPARTAN) Flight Controller, for the International Space Station

See also
 Sparta (disambiguation)